Rapagnano is a comune (municipality) in the Province of Fermo in the Italian region Marche, located about  south of Ancona and about  north of Ascoli Piceno.

References
Official Site of Rapagnano (Italian)

Cities and towns in the Marche